Nicholas Vrdoljak  or Nikola Vrdoljak (born July 11, 1996) is a Croatian figure skater. He has competed at one World and two European Championships, qualifying to the free skate at the 2016 European Championships.

Personal life 
Vrdoljak was born on July 11, 1996, in Hinsdale, Illinois, United States. His parents are from Split, Croatia. His father died in 2007. Growing up in a family of auto enthusiasts, he enjoys building, tuning, and racing muscle cars. Vrdoljak attends College of DuPage majoring in Automotive Technology.

Career 
Vrdoljak began learning to skate in 2004. He became the 2009 U.S. national juvenile champion and 2013 U.S. national novice bronze medalist. He placed 5th in the junior ranks at the 2014 U.S. Championships. He made no international appearances for the United States.

Vrdoljak debuted internationally for Croatia in September 2015, placing 8th at a Junior Grand Prix event in Colorado Springs, Colorado. Making his first senior-level appearance, he placed 10th at the 2015 CS Golden Spin of Zagreb in December. In January, he competed at the 2016 European Championships in Bratislava, Slovakia; he qualified to the free skate and finished 21st overall.

Vrdoljak placed 26th at the 2017 European Championships in Ostrava, Czech Republic, and 34th at the 2017 World Championships in Helsinki, Finland.

Programs

Competitive highlights 
CS: Challenger Series; JGP: Junior Grand Prix

For Croatia

United States

References

External links 
 

1996 births
American people of Croatian descent
Croatian male single skaters
Living people
People from Hinsdale, Illinois